Tepetitán is the name of several places

 Tepetitán, El Salvador, in the département of San Vicente in El Salvador
 Tepetitán, Tabasco, in the state of Tabasco in Mexico